Tell Me When is a 2021 Mexican romantic comedy film directed and written by Gerardo Gatica González and starring Héctor Bonilla, Ofelia Reyes Botello and Brett Calo.

Cast 
 Héctor Bonilla as Juancho
 Ofelia Reyes Botello
 Brett Calo as Will (voice)
 Manolo Caro
 Verónica Castro as Ines
 Lee Cohen as Beto (voice)
 Gilli Messer as Dani (voice)
 Gabriel Nuncio as Beto
 Ludwika Paleta
 Michael C. Pizzuto as Ramiro (voice)
 Ximena Romo as Dani
 Matthew David Rudd as Javier
 José Carlos Ruiz as Pepe
 José Salof
 Juca Viapri as Gabriel
 Jesús Zavala as Will

References

External links
 
 

2021 films
2020s Spanish-language films
2021 romantic comedy films
Mexican romantic comedy films
2020s Mexican films